The bouldering events at the 2015 IFSC Climbing World Cup took place in various countries between May and August of that year. The winners were awarded trophies, the best three finishers received medals, and prize money was awarded to the top six finishers at each stop.
At the end of the season an overall ranking was determined based upon points, which athletes were awarded for finishing in the top 30 of each individual event. Akiyo Noguchi won the overall women's World Cup and Jongwon Chon won the overall men's World Cup.

Toronto, Canada (30–31 May)

Women 
59 athletes attended the World Cup in Toronto. Anna Stöhr won the competition.

Men 
73 athletes attended the World Cup in Toronto. Alban Levier won the competition.

Vail, USA (5–6 June)

Women 
52 athletes attended the World Cup in Vail. Megan Mascarenas won the competition.

Men 
76 athletes attended the World Cup in Vail. Jan Hojer won the competition.

Chongqing, China (20–21 June)

Women 
32 athletes attended the World Cup in Chongqing. Akiyo Noguchi won the competition.

Men 
56 athletes attended the World Cup in Chongqing. Sean McColl won the competition.

Haiyang, China (26–27 June)

Women 
31 athletes attended the World Cup in Haiyang. Petra Klingler won the competition.

Men 
53 athletes attended the World Cup in Haiyang. Jongwon Chon won the competition.

Munich, Germany (14–15 August)

Women 
86 athletes attended the World Cup in Munich. Shauna Coxsey won the competition.

Men 
125 athletes attended the World Cup in Munich. Alexey Rubtsov won the competition.

Overall Ranking

Women 
5 best competition results were counted for IFSC Climbing Worldcup 2015. Akiyo Noguchi won.

Men 
5 best competition results were counted for IFSC Climbing Worldcup 2015. Jongwon Chon won.

National Team Ranking 
For National Team Ranking, 3 best results per competition and category were counted. Japan won.

References

IFSC Climbing World Cup
2015 in sport climbing